Voghji may refer to:

Voghji, Shirak, Armenia
Voghji, Syunik, Armenia
Voghji (river), a river of Armenia and Azerbaijan